The Whareama River is a river of the Wellington Region of New Zealand's North Island.

See also
List of rivers of New Zealand
List of rivers of Wellington Region

References

Rivers of the Wellington Region